In the 2011 FIFA Beach Soccer World Cup the main disciplinary action taken against players comes in the form of red and yellow cards.

Any player picking up a red card is expelled from the pitch and automatically banned for his country's next match, whether via a straight red or second yellow.

Disciplinary statistics
Total number of yellow cards: 48
Average yellow cards per match: 1.71
Total number of red cards: 1
Average red cards per match: 0.04
Total number of red cards via second yellow card: 2
Average red cards via second yellow card per match: 0.07
First yellow card: Abdullah Al Qsami – Oman against Argentina
First red card: Hassan Abdollahi – Iran against Switzerland
Fastest yellow card from kick off: 0:25 minutes – Tomas Hernandez – El Salvador against Portugal
Most yellow cards (team): 5 – Senegal
Most red cards (team): 1 – Iran
Fewest yellow cards (team): 0 – Argentina
Most yellow cards (player): 3 – Hamid Ghorbanpour, Pape Koukpaki
Most red cards (player): 1 – Hassan Abdollahi
Most yellow cards (match): 6 – Iran against Italy
Most red cards (match): 1 – Iran against Switzerland
Fewest yellow cards (match): 0 – Oman against El Salvador, Nigeria against Russia
Most cards in one match: 6 yellow cards and 1 red card – Italy v Iran

Sanctions

By match
Note: In this table the "Yellow" column counts only the first yellow card given to a player in a match.  If a player receives a second yellow in the same match this is counted under "Second yellow"

By referee

By team

By individual

References
Cards - Players
Cards - Teams

Disciplinary Record